Eoghan Ruadh Mac an Bhaird (c. 1600 –  c. 1610?) Gaelic-Irish Bardic poet.

Eoghan Ruadh was a member of the Mac an Bhaird clan of professional poets, originally from County Galway with a more notable branch settling in County Donegal in the 14th or 15th century.

His surviving compositions are A bhráighe tá i dtor London, Leabhran Gaedhilge, Sgeala Craidhte, Comhdhail Siothchana, and Aodh Ruadh Ó Domhnaill, the latter for Hugh Roe Ó Donnell.

References

 The Surnames of Ireland, Edward MacLysaght, 1978.

External links
 http://www.ucc.ie/celt/online/G402143/header.html
 http://www.irishtimes.com/ancestor/surname/index.cfm?fuseaction=Go.&UserID=

17th-century Irish-language poets
People from County Donegal
Year of death unknown
Year of birth unknown
Year of birth uncertain